Pete Sampras was the defending champion, but did not compete this year.

Richard Krajicek won the title by defeating Mark Woodforde 6–4, 2–6, 6–4 in the final.

Seeds

Draw

Finals

Top half

Bottom half

References

External links
 Official results archive (ATP)
 Official results archive (ITF)

Los Angeles Open (tennis)
1992 ATP Tour
Volvo Tennis Los Angeles
Volvo Tennis Los Angeles